Kosovo competed at the inaugural 7 sports 2018 European Championships from 2 to 12 August 2018.

Competitors

Six competitors competed in two sports; two competing in athletics and four in aquatics.

Aquatics

Athletics

 Men 
 Track and road

Women
 Track and road

See also
Kosovo at the European Championships

References

External links
 European Championships official site

2018
Nations at the 2018 European Championships
2018 in Kosovan sport